The Eugene V. Debs Award is an award accorded by the Eugene V. Debs Foundation, in Terre Haute, Indiana, each year since 1965 (apart from 2020), honoring a person or organization whose work has been consistent with the spirit, values, and legacy of Eugene V. Debs and who has contributed to the advancement of the causes of industrial unionism, social justice, or world peace.

Recipients

See also
 List of awards for contributions to society
 List of peace prizes

References

External links

Terre Haute, Indiana
Awards established in 1965
Award
Awards for contributions to society